A by-election was held for the New South Wales Legislative Assembly electorate of Clarence on 25 May 1996 following the resignation of sitting member, Ian Causley, to contest federal seat of Page at the 1996 election.

On the same day, by-elections were held in the seats of Orange, Pittwater, Southern Highlands and Strathfield.

All seats were retained by the Liberal-National Parties, with the exception of Clarence, that was won by the Labor Party with a swing on a two-party preferred basis of 13.96%. The successful ALP candidate was Harry Woods who was the sitting member for the federal seat of Page when he was defeated at the 1996 federal election by Ian Causley, ironically the previous member for Clarence.

Results

Ian Causley resigned to successfully contest federal seat of Page, defeating Harry Woods.

See also
Electoral results for the district of Clarence
List of New South Wales state by-elections

References

1996 elections in Australia
New South Wales state by-elections
1990s in New South Wales